The OECD Guidelines for Multinational Enterprises are recommendations on responsible business conduct addressed by governments to multinational enterprises operating in or from the 50 adhering countries.  The Guidelines provide non-binding principles and standards for responsible business conduct in a global context that are consistent with applicable laws and internationally recognised standards.

The Guidelines are legally non-binding, but the OECD Investment Committee and its Working Party on Responsible Business Conduct encourage implementation among adherents. The most concrete manifestation of government commitment to the principles set forth in the Guidelines are the National Contact Points (NCPs), which are offices charged with promoting observance of the Guidelines by multinational enterprises. Each of the 50 adhering countries are required to set up an NCP.

Among other tasks, NCPs are charged with supporting a grievance mechanism called 'specific instances' — under this procedure, alleged non-observance of one or more of the Guidelines' recommendations is brought to the attention of an NCP, which then is responsible for helping the parties to find a resolution for the issues raised by providing access to consensual and non-adversarial procedures.

Since the mediation procedure was invented in 2000, 450 specific instances have been handled covering such areas as employment and industrial relations (about half of the specific instances), environment, human rights and disclosure of information (the database on specific instances covers the 2000-2019 period).

Originally, the Declaration and the Guidelines were adopted by the NP in 1976. The Guidelines were subsequently revised in 1979, 1982, 1984, 1991, 2000 and, most recently, in 2011.

Issues covered

The Guidelines cover business ethics on a range of issues, including:
employment and industrial relations
human rights
environment
information disclosure
combating bribery
consumer interests
science and technology
competition
taxation.

In addition, the OECD has developed more detailed guidance in a number of sectors to help enterprises implement the Guidelines and proactively identify risks of adverse impacts. These sectors include extractives, mineral supply chains, agricultural supply chains, garment supply chains, and the financial sector. The work of the National Contact Points in support of this development is called the "proactive agenda."

Supporting institutions

National Contact Points
According to the OECD Council decision each adhering country has to set up a National Contact Point (NCP), an entity responsible for the promotion of the Guidelines on a national level. It handles all enquiries and matters related to the Guidelines in that  country, including investigating complaints (referred to as "specific instances") about a company operating in, or headquartered in that country. Some NCPS are based in a relevant government department; others are independent structures comprising government officials, trade unions, employers unions and sometimes non-governmental organisations. 

The functioning of the NCPs is reviewed every year and the findings are summarised in an annual report. In order to improve their functioning and coherence across adherent countries, the NCPs established a peer review schedule in 2016 that plans 4-6 reviews annually. These peer reviews provide an in-depth focus on the functioning of individual NCPs.

OECD Investment Committee
The OECD Investment Committee is the primary body responsible for overseeing the functioning of the Guidelines and implementation of all OECD investment instruments. The Committee consists of member states' senior officials from treasuries, economics, trade and industry, and foreign affairs ministries and central banks. All OECD member states are members of the Investment Committee. Argentina and Brazil are observers and the 13 non-Members that have subscribed to the Declaration participate in the work of the committee on issues related to the Guidelines.  A Working Party on Responsible Business Conduct was established in 2013 as a subsidiary body of the Investment Committee to help implement the Guidelines and strengthen the system of National Contact Points.

Adhering countries

See also
Multilateral Agreement on Investment
OECD Anti-Bribery Convention

The Trade Union Advisory Committee to the OECD

References

External links
Text of the OECD Guidelines for Multinational Enterprises
Contact information of the NCPs
OECD Watch
TUAC OECD Guidelines Website
The OECD Declaration on International Investment and Multinational Enterprises profile on database of market governance mechanisms

OECD treaties
Corruption
International factor movements